Charles Lynn Pyron (1819–1869) was a soldier in the United States Army in the Mexican–American War and a Confederate Army officer in the American Civil War. He fought at the Battle of Monterrey in the Mexican–American War, and during the Civil War fought in the West, including at the battles of Valverde and Glorieta Pass.

Biography
Pyron was born in 1819 in Marion County, Alabama, the son of Charles Pyron. He served with the United States Army during the Mexican–American War. After the war, he purchased a ranch along the San Antonio River in Texas, and also became married in 1849.

During the American Civil War, Pyron served in Confederate Brigadier General Henry Hopkins Sibley's New Mexico Campaign, an invasion of New Mexico and Colorado with the goal of capturing the Southwest United States, including the Colorado gold fields and California. He raised a company of cavalry for the Confederates at San Antonio, which served as Company B of John Baylor's Second Texas Mounted Rifles at Fort Lancaster and Fort Stockton.

Pyron was a major in the Confederate Army and in March 1862 commanded a Confederate force of 200–300 Texans on an advance expedition over the Glorieta Pass. The pass was a strategic location on the Santa Fe Trail at the southern tip of the Sangre de Cristo Mountains southeast of Santa Fe. Control of the pass would allow the Confederates to advance onto the High Plains and to make an assault on Fort Union, the Union stronghold along the invasion route northward over Raton Pass. After a few small battles, Union forces forced the withdrawal of the Confederates.

He was promoted to lieutenant colonel after the New Mexico campaign and was given command of Baylor's Second Texas Mounted Rifles, which was reorganized as the Second or Pyron's Texas Cavalry. He was later promoted to colonel.

He lived on his ranch in San Antonio, Texas after the war, and died on August 24, 1869.

External links
 Handbook of Texas Online
 Baylor's Command
 Texas Cemetery Records
 

1819 births
1869 deaths
Confederate States Army officers
American military personnel of the Mexican–American War
People of Texas in the American Civil War
People of Alabama in the American Civil War